Kenny Dennis LP is a studio album by American rapper Serengeti. It was released on Anticon on June 25, 2013.

Critical reception

At Metacritic, which assigns a weighted average score out of 100 to reviews from mainstream critics, the album received an average score of 80, based on 10 reviews, indicating "generally favorable reviews".

Jason Lymangrover of AllMusic described Odd Nosdam's production as "a top-shelf blend of golden age and futuristic beats". Jon Hadusek of Consequence of Sound said, "there’s really no better album to start the KD saga with; producer Odd Nosdam's wobbling, jazzy beats give the record a laid-back cohesion, and Serengeti sounds as tight as ever."

Spin included it on the "40 Best Hip-Hop Albums of 2013" list.

Track listing

Personnel
Credits adapted from liner notes.

 Serengeti – vocals
 Anders Holm – vocals
 Odd Nosdam – production
 Jel – turntables
 Daddy Kev – mastering
 Silas – artwork

References

External links
 

2013 albums
Serengeti (rapper) albums
Anticon albums
Albums produced by Odd Nosdam